Nadodimannan is a 2013 Indian Malayalam-language satirical action comedy film directed by Viji Thampi, starring Dileep, Sayaji Shinde, Nedumudi Venu and Ananya. Dileep and Viji Thampi collaborated after 17 years in this movie. The film is a satire that portrays how corruption and favoritism engulfs a place and how it is curbed.

Plot

The movie starts with Vinayachandran, an environmentalist getting killed by a Rich Real Estate Criminal, Pushpam Prakashan and his henchmen as Vinayachandran was opposing Prakashan's dream project- Pushpam Mall citing environmental and societal reasons. Prakashan has the backing of ruling party, police and a corrupt Mayor Purushothaman for all his wrongdoings as he helps them financially whenever they are in need. Once his eyes cast on something, Prakashan will try to acquire it by any means for his gains. His next target is an old man Damodaran's house and its surrounding plot occupied by Damodaran and his granddaughter Meera for developing another project. Even though Damodaran approaches higher-ranked officials including Mayor to save from the advances of Prakashan, he now realizes that they all are nothing but associates of Prakashan. One night, Prakashan's henchmen attacked him and tried to kidnap Meera. In the tussle, Damodaran stabs himself and Prakashan's henchmen hospitalized him as his death will bring trouble to Prakashan.

The film then focus to Palakkad where Padmanabhan hails from. Padmanabhan is a carefree and cheerful guy who along with his friends do road side shows, artificial political rallies, marches and hail and hoot for movies in theatres for daily wages. One day, he gets a call from Thiruvananthapuram to get his gang for organizing a political rally in support of Mayor Purushothaman to boost his image in the upcoming election. Padmanabhan and his gang leaves to Thiruvananthapuram the next day and he gets injured in a bomb blast and gets hospitalized.

Padmanabhan knowingly and unknowingly involves in the various issues happening there. When the people found a leader's characteristics in Padmanbhan they and Thiruvithancore (Travancore) Thirumanassu force him to contest in the upcoming election. He wins the election and becomes the next mayor. Being the mayor if the city, Padmanabhan is loved by every body he starts building public parks and facilities for the common people he also asks the people to give away the places which really belongs to the government. By seeing all these changes Prakashan gets furious and tries to kill Padmanabhan but the plan doesn't go as planned when Padmanabhan's mother and his chauffeur Subair gets killed in the accident made by Prakashan's henchman Kannappan.

Padmanabhan devises a plan to get revenge on Prakashan he decides to destroy Pushpam Mall for good. He calls on a demolition firm and sets the equipments for demolition all throughout the building. But when there is only 15 minutes left for demolition 
Prakashan calls Padmanabhan saying that he has kidnapped Thirumanassu. Padmanabhan rushes into the building and fights off Prakashan and Kannappan. During the fight, Kannappan is accidentally killed by Prakashan with a gun when he tries to shoot Padmanabhan. When Padmanabhan is about to kill Prakashan, Thirumeni stops him, saying to him "let god decide his fate," but Padmanabhan cuts Prakashan's thumb for accessing the elevator and they escape just in time and the building is demolished killing Prakashan along with it. The mall is now converted to a public park.

Cast

 Dileep as Mayor Padmanabhan
 Sayaji Shinde as Pushpam Prakashan, an evil and corrupt mayor of Thiruvananthapuram
 Nedumudi Venu as Thiruvilancore Maharajah
 Ananya as Meera, Padmanabhan's love interest
 Archana Kavi as Athira, Granddaughter of the Maharajah
 Mythili as Rima, a journalist 
 Shobha Mohan as Jalaja, Padmanabhan's mother
 Janardhanan as Damodaran, Meera's grandfather
 Suraj Venjaramoodu as Sarasappan, Padmanabhan's friend 
 Salim Kumar as Ravi, Padmanabhan's brother in law
 Riyaz Khan as George T. V., Circle Inspector of Police and associate of Pushpam Prakashan 
 Vijayaraghavan as former Mayor Purushothoman an arrogant mayor
 Saikumar as Chief Minister Thomas Chacko
 Shammi Thilakan as CI Karadi Johnny 
 Shivaji Guruvayoor as Hameed 
 Kalabhavan Prajod as Subair
 Sreelatha Namboothiri as Subair's mother
 Mohan Jose as Finance Minister K. A. Paulose
 Ashokan as Vinayachandran
 Balachandran Chullikadu as KRP
 Sunil Sukhada as Varijakshan
 Manu Varma as Kuruvila Joseph
 Kozhikode Narayanan Nair as Maharaja's associate
 Chali Pala as Peelipose, Associate of Pushpam Prakashan
 Abu Salim as Kannappan Pushpam Prakashan's Hechmen
 Kulappulli Leela as Leela
 Sreekala Sasidharan as Deepa, Vinayachandran's wife
 Murali as Sakhavu Madhavan, Padmanabhan's late father (Photo archive) 
 Asif Ali as Arun, Rima's husband (Photo archive)
 Narayanankutty
 Vettur Purushan
 Kalabhavan Haneef as Vasu
 Shiju as Chandrakumar, Owner of Demolition Company 
 Koottickal Jayachandran as Santhosh, Padmanabhan's friend
 A. S. Joby as Krishnankutty
 Kalabhavan Rahman
 Gayathri (Malayalam actress)
 Mini Arun

Music 
The film features three tracks composed by Vidyasagar.

References

2010s Malayalam-language films
2013 films
Indian action comedy films
Films about corruption in India
Films scored by Vidyasagar
Films shot in Thiruvananthapuram
Films shot in Palakkad
Films directed by Viji Thampi
Indian satirical films
2010s satirical films